Alder Creek is a  river located in Siskiyou County, California.

References

Rivers of Siskiyou County, California
Rivers of Northern California